The South American U-15 Women’s Softball Championship is the main championship tournament between national women softball teams in South America, governed by the Pan American Softball Federation.

Results

Medal table

Participating nations

External links
Brazilian Baseball Softball Federation

Softball competitions